Squash competitions at the 2022 Bolivarian Games in Valledupar, Colombia were held from 25 to 29 June 2022 at Unidad Deportiva El Salitre in Bogotá, a sub-venue outside Valledupar.

Seven medal events were scheduled to be contested; singles, doubles and team events for men and women plus a mixed doubles event. A total of 45 athletes (23 men and 22 women) competed in the events. The events were open competitions without age restrictions.

Colombia, who were the competition defending champions after Santa Marta 2017, won the squash competitions again after winning 6 of the 7 gold medals at stake

Participating nations
A total of 8 nations (6 ODEBO nations and 2 invited) registered athletes for the squash competitions. Each nation was able to enter a maximum of 8 athletes (4 per gender). Each nation could register up to two athletes for each men and women singles events; one pair for each men, women and mixed doubles events and one team conformed by four athletes for both men and women team events

Venue
The squash competitions were held at squash courts of the Unidad Deportiva El Salitre, in Bogotá. Squash events were originally scheduled to be held at Club El Nogal also in Bogotá.

Medal summary

Medal table

Medalists

References

External links
Bolivarianos Valledupar 2022 Squash

2022 in squash
2022 Bolivarian Games